Year 186 (CLXXXVI) was a common year starting on Saturday (link will display the full calendar) of the Julian calendar. At the time, it was known as the Year of the Consulship of Aurelius and Glabrio (or, less frequently, year 939 Ab urbe condita). The denomination 186 for this year has been used since the early medieval period, when the Anno Domini calendar era became the prevalent method in Europe for naming years.

Events 
 By place 
 Roman Empire 
 Peasants in Gaul stage an anti-tax uprising under Maternus.
 Roman governor Pertinax escapes an assassination attempt, by British usurpers.

 New Zealand 
 The Hatepe volcanic eruption extends Lake Taupo and makes skies red across the world. However, recent radiocarbon dating by R. Sparks has put the date at 233 AD ± 13 (95% confidence).

Births 
 Ma Liang, Chinese official of the Shu Han state (d. 222)

Deaths 
 April 21 – Apollonius the Apologist, Christian martyr
 Bian Zhang, Chinese official and general (b. 133)
 Paccia Marciana, Roman noblewoman (approximate date)
 Sohaemus, Roman client king of Armenia

References